Egil Skallagrímsson (904 995) was a Viking Age war poet, sorcerer, berserker, and farmer. He is known mainly as the anti-hero of Egil's Saga. Egil's Saga historically narrates a period from approximately 850 to 1000 AD and is believed to have been written between 1220 and 1240 AD.

Life

Egil is born in Iceland, to Skalla-Grímr Kveldúlfsson and Bera Yngvarsdóttir; he is the grandson of Kveld-Úlfr (whose name means "evening Wolf"). Another of his ancestors, Hallbjörn, is Norwegian-Sami.

Skalla-Grímr is a respected chieftain, and mortal enemy of King Harald Fairhair of Norway. He migrates to Iceland, settling at Borg where his father Kveld-Úlfr's coffin lands after being ritualistically set adrift as Skalla-Grímr's boat approached Iceland. Skalla-Grímr and wife Bera had two daughters, Sæunn and Þórunn, and two sons, Þorolfr and Egil.

Egil composed his first poem at the age of three years. He exhibits berserk behaviour, and this, together with the description of his large and unattractive head, has led to the theory that he might have suffered from Paget's disease, which causes a thickening of the bones and may lead eventually to blindness.

At the age of seven, Egil is cheated in a game with local boys. Enraged, he goes home, procures an axe, and, returning to the boys, splits the skull to the teeth of the boy who had cheated him. After Berg-Önundr refuses to allow Egil to claim his wife Ásgerðr's share of her father's inheritance, he challenged Önundr to a man-to-man fight on an island (a hólmganga). Berg-Önundr refuses the challenge but is later killed along with his brother Hadd by Egil. Egil is later to kill the last of the brothers, Atli the Short, by biting through Atli's neck during a holmgangr.

Later, after being grievously insulted, Egil kills Bárðr of Atley, a retainer of King Eiríkr Bloodaxe and kinsman of Queen Gunnhildr, both of whom spend the remainder of their lives trying to take vengeance. Seething with hatred, Gunnhildr orders her two brothers, Eyvindr Braggart and  Álfr Aksmann, to assassinate Egil and his brother Þórólfr, who has been on good terms with her previously. However, Egil slays the Queen's brothers when they attempt to confront him.

In spring Þórólfr and Egil prepare a large warship and raid along the Eastern route (Austrvegr), where they win much wealth and have many battles. In Courland they make a peace for half a month and trade with the men of the land (ch. 46).

That same summer, Haraldr Fairhair dies. In order to secure his place as sole King of Norway, Eiríkr Bloodaxe murders his two brothers. He then declares Egil an outlaw in Norway. Berg-Önundr gathers a company of men to capture Egil, but is killed during his attempt to do so. Before escaping from Norway, Egil also slays Rögnvaldr, the son of King Eiríkr and Queen Gunnhildr. He then curses the King and Queen, setting a horse's head on a Nithing pole and saying
"Here I set up a níð-pole, and declare this níð against King Eiríkr and Queen Gunnhildr,"—he turned the horse-head to face the mainland—"I declare this níð at the land-spirits there, and the land itself, so that all will fare astray, not to hold nor find their places, not until they wreak King Eiríkr and Gunnhildr from the land." He set up the pole of níð in the cliff-face and left it standing; he faced the horse's eyes on the land, and he carved runes upon the pole, and said all the formal words of the curse. (ch. 57).

Gunnhildr also puts a spell on Egil, cursing him to feel restless and depressed until they meet again.

Soon afterwards, Eiríkr and Gunnhildr are forced to flee to the Kingdom of Northumbria by Prince Hákon. In Saxon England, they become King and Queen of Northumbria in rivalry with King Athelstan of England. In time, Egil is shipwrecked in Northumbria and learns who rules the land. Egil seeks out the house of his good friend Arinbjörn, where they arm themselves and march to Eiríkr's court. Arinbjörn tells Egil "now you must go and offer the king your head and embrace his foot. I will present your case to him." Arinbjörn presents Egil's case and Egil composes a short drápa, reciting it with Eiríkr's foot in his hand, but Eiríkr is not impressed. He explains that Egil's wrongs to him were far too great to be forgiven so easily. Gunnhildr calls for the immediate execution of Egil, but Arinbjörn convinces the king not to kill him until the morning.

Arinbjörn tells Egil that he should stay up all night and compose a mighty head-ransom poem or drápa fit for such a king, a poem in praise of his enemy. In the morning Egil goes back before king Eiríkr and recites the great drápa. This twenty-stanza long head-ransom poem appears in Chapter 63 of Egils saga. Eiríkr is so surprised by the quality of the poem that he decides to give Egil his life, even though Egil has killed Eiríkr's own son. The complex nature of these poems, with complex poetic metres and metaphors (including kennings), as well as the fact that they were often about kings reliably attested in the historical record, provides some basis for supposing that they might have been composed by a historically real Egil Skallagrímsson, descending more or less unchanged through oral tradition from the time of their composition to the writing of Egils saga. Egils saga and some other Icelandic sagas appear to hang on a skeletal framework of such complex poetry, a spine of historical truth.

Egil also fights at the Battle of Brunanburh in the service of King Æthelstan; his brother Þórólfr dies there, for which Egil receives two chests of silver from Æthelstan in compensation.

Ultimately, Egil returns to his family farm in Iceland, where he remains a force to be reckoned with in local politics. He lives into his eighties, grows blind, and dies shortly before the Christianisation of Iceland. Before Egil dies he buries his silver near Mosfellsbær. In his last act of violence he kills the servants who help him bury his treasure.

When a Christian chapel is constructed at the family homestead, Egil's body is exhumed by his son and re-buried near the altar. According to the saga, the exhumed skull bone was hit with an axe, and it only turned white, showing the strength of the warrior, but also, according to one modern interpretations, suggesting the traits of Paget's disease.

Physical appearance
In chapter 55 of Egil's Saga, his appearance is described as follows

Issue
According to Egils saga, Egil has five children with Ásgerðr Björnsdóttir: Þorgerðr Egilsdóttir, Bera Egilsdóttir, Böðvar Egilsson, Gunnar Egilsson and Þorsteinn Egilsson. In later years, Iceland's Mýrar clan claimed descent from him.

Poems
Apart from being a warrior of immense might in literary sources, Egil is also celebrated for his poetry, considered by many historians to be the finest of the ancient Scandinavian poets and Sonatorrek, the dirge over his own sons, has been called "the birth of Nordic personal lyric poetry".  His poems were also the first Old Norse verses to use end rhyme. The following works are attributed to Egil:

Aðalsteinsdrápa. Drápa for the Anglo-Saxon King Æthelstan.
Höfuðlausn ("The Head Ransom", sometimes referred to as "Head-Ransom"), with which Egil bought his life from Eiríkr Bloodaxe, who had sentenced him to death in England.
Sonatorrek ("The Loss of a Son"). After the death of his son Böðvar who drowned during a storm.
Arinbjarnarkviða. Dedicated to his companion Arinbjörn
Skjaldardrápa.
Berudrápa.
Lausavísur.
Fragments

The following is one of Egil's Lausavísur (no. 3), found in chapter 40 of Egils Saga:

Runes
Egil was also a scholar of runes.  His apparent mastery of their magic powers assisted him several times during his journeys.  During a feast at Atla-isle, Bard's attempt to poison Egil failed when a rune carved by Egil shattered his poisoned cup.

At a companion's request, he examined a sick woman.  A local land owner, after being denied her hand in marriage, had attempted to carve love-runes.  Instead, he had mistakenly carved runes causing illness.  Egil burned the offending runes and carved runes for health, and the woman recovered.  He then sang a poem declaring that "Runes none should grave ever/Who knows not to read them."

As for the sick young woman, in addition to burning the runes, Egil ordered her to be lifted out of bed and her old bedding to be thrown away and replaced with new sheets. Recovery was swift.

Runes were also employed by Egil during the raising of the Nithing Pole against King Eirik Bloodaxe and Queen Gunnhildr.

Egil in popular culture
 The Icelandic brewery Ölgerðin Egil Skallagrímsson is named after him.
 There is a talk show on Icelandic television called Egil's Silver, named after Egil's hidden treasure (the title is also a play on words with the host's name being Egil.)
 "Egil's Silver" is also the name of a song by Megas, from his first album.
 In the Society for Creative Anachronism Barony of Adiantum there is an "Egil Skallagrimsson Memorial Tournament" held annually on memorial day weekend.
 The novelist Poul Anderson (a member of the SCA) wrote Mother of Kings, a historical fantasy centered on Gunnhildr and the long feud that she, Eirikr, and their children had with Egil.  The novel is based on Heimskringla and Egils Saga.
 "Egil Saga" is a song on the album Licht by the German band, Faun. The lyrics are taken from "Egils Saga" and tell the story of the girl made sick by the runes and how Egil cured her.
 Egil Skallagrímsson is a character in the historical fiction series Saxon Stories by Bernard Cornwell, who settles in Northumbria for a time as a close friend and ally to a fictionalized Uhtred of Bebbanburg. Similar to his historical counterpart, he fights at the Battle of Brunanburh, alongside his brother Thorolfr and Lord Uhtred.

Footnotes

References
Jansson, Sven B. (1980). Runstenar. STF, Stockholm. 
Palsson, Hermann and Edwards, Paul (Translators), Egil's Saga 1976, Penguin Classics
Thorsson, Örnólfur, ed. (2000). The Sagas of the Icelanders: A Selection. New York, New York: Penguin Putnam.

External links

Poems, at Skaldic Poetry of the Scandinavian Middle Ages website

In English:
Egil's saga - English translation (W. C. Green) at the Icelandic Saga Database, with original Old Norse and Icelandic text
Egil Skallagrimsson and the Viking Ideal by Christina von Nolcken, from a University of Chicago website
Egil's Bones, from a University of California, Los Angeles website
Text of the saga, translated into English by Rev. W. C. Green in 1893, from the Northvegr Foundation

In  Icelandic:
Egils saga—Text of Egils saga at the Icelandic Saga Database, modern spelling and Old Norse version
Text of Egil's saga, with modern spelling
Höfundur Egil Skallagrímsson

10th-century Vikings
900s births
990s deaths
Year of birth uncertain
Year of death uncertain
Viking warriors
10th-century Icelandic poets